Wong Fort Pin (Pha̍k-fa-sṳ: Vòng Fò-phìn) is a Malaysian politician and doctor. He served as Member of the Malacca State Legislative Assembly (MLA) for Bemban for a term from May 2018 to November 2021 and Deputy Speaker of the Malacca State Legislative Assembly from 2018 until 2020 political crisis.

Wong is a member Democratic Action Party (DAP), a component party of Pakatan Harapan (PH) coalition.

Background
Wong grew up in Nyalas and Bukit Baru, Malacca. He studied in Ping Ming Primary Chinese School, St. David's High School, High School Malacca, and Kaohsiung Medical College, Taiwan. He obtained DRM, Diploma in Reproductive Medicine from Academy of Family Physicians of Malaysia. Active in athletic events, a scout and a prefect in school.

He have his own Medical GP clinic in Bukit Baru. Begun to get involve in Addiction Medicine since 2004.

Politics
On 17 September 2015, Wong who is a doctor and also the Bukit Palah DAP branch chairman then, successfully sued fellow DAP state leaders in conflict, Sim Tong Him and Goh Leong San for defamation because of libelous media statements they have issued which implicate him in outraging the modesty of his patients and also accused his sibling of being involved in illegal activities. He won RM300,000 in damages.

In the 2018 general election (GE14), Wong was picked by DAP to contest and was elected as an assemblyman for Bemban constituency for the first time. He was also selected to be the Deputy Speaker of the Malacca State Legislative Assembly.

In October 2018, DAP secretary-general Lim Guan Eng had rebuked the DAP Malacca chief Tey Kok Kiew and Wong on the acceptance the Malacca state "Datukship" in their first year as MLA which had breached the party's long-standing principal agreed upon since the mid-1990s on DAP elected representatives not to receive honours awards during their active political service period. Lim called for those involved to apologise which Wong had obliged and even offered to return the award but Tey did not and remained adamant.

Wong was however dropped by DAP as a PH candidate in the subsequent 2021 Malacca state election to give way to younger face.

Election results

Honours

Honours of Malaysia
  :
  Companion Class I of the Order of Malacca (DMSM) – Datuk (2018)

References

External links
 

1955 births
Living people
People from Malacca
Malaysian people of Chinese descent
Democratic Action Party (Malaysia) politicians
Members of the Malacca State Legislative Assembly
21st-century Malaysian politicians